Laura Haim (or Laurence Haim, as she is known in France) is a French-American journalist. She was born on May 20, 1966 in Paris, France.

Career

Pre-Obama 
She was a former correspondent at the CAPA agency in Washington (led by Hervé Chabalier) where she worked between 1989 and 1995. She was one of the first journalists there and was associated with the production of programs like "24 hours" on Canal +, "Envoyé spécial" (the French 60 Minutes) on France 2, and "Zone interdite" on M6.
As a foreign correspondent for CAPA, she covered international events such as the famine in Somalia, the beginning of the war in Bosnia, and the situation in Israel, the West Bank, and Gaza.

In 1992, Laura moved to New York to pursue her interest in working in the U.S. She created the first office for Canal Plus Group, where she worked as a correspondent until 2001.
After September 11, 2001, Laura was sent on assignment to Israel. A suicide bombing occurred there, which she began documenting. At the time, Dan Rather of CBS News was also on location. After meeting her, he decided to hire her to work as a producer and video journalist for CBS News.

From 2002 to 2006, Laura was mainly based in Baghdad, where she covered the Iraq war and the Near East for CBS.

Obama's campaign and presidential mandate 
Haim went back to the United States in October 2006. At that point, she suggested to Canal Plus that she follow Barack Obama's campaign. In 2008, she became an accredited White House and Pentagon correspondent for Canal Plus Group and moved to Washington, D.C. to follow the Obama administration on a daily basis. In June 2009, she conducted another interview with the President Obama, which aired on Canal +. She also covered the sex scandal involving Dominique Strauss-Khan, the former managing director of the IMF who wanted to run for president in France.

Haim covered news and became a regular face on the 24-hour cable news channel of Canal Plus, I-Télé, which aired in over 60 French-speaking countries, including those in Africa.
She also founded the first group for the foreign White House correspondents accredited to the White House. From 2009 to 2014 she was twice elected president of the White House Foreign Press Association by her peers.

Haim is known for being the only French journalist who has conducted three interviews with Barack Obama during his time as Senator and President.

Trump’s campaign and presidential mandate 
In April 2015, she offered to cover Donald Trump's campaign for Canal Plus. Shortly thereafter, she became the only permanent accredited European journalist for the Trump campaign abroad from August 2016 until his election. 
In 2015 Laura obtained an interview with Israeli Prime Minister Benjamin Netanyahu during the war in Gaza, and was also the only French journalist able to do so. In 2016 she also did an interview for French television with one of the Navy Seals who said he killed Osama bin Laden during the raid.

She has also traveled to Guantanamo on more than eight occasions to document the 9/11 pre-trials.

The French presidential campaign with Emmanuel Macron 
To the surprise of many, Laura was offered the position of spokesperson for international affairs for Emmanuel Macron’s presidential campaign, and she joined his team in December 2016.
On July 12, 2017, after President Macron’s campaign, Laura decided to come back to the United States and join the Institute of Political Studies at the University of Chicago's Institute of Politics, headed by David Axelrod, a former adviser to Barack Obama. She became a fellow there.

Awards 
In 2013 and 2014 she was named in France Best Foreign Correspondent and also received the award "Femme en Or, Media Woman of the Year." The news magazine France-Amérique featured her as one of the most important French people living in the U.S.

She was made Chevalier de La Legion d'Honneur in 2015 for her serious journalism and work in the U.S.

Documentaries

Documentaries for French TV 

 2006: Fire Island
 2007, April: Darfur ER with George Clooney (45 minutes). Envoyé spécial
 2008: No Access (55min). CAPA
 2010: Full Access (1h17). CAPA
 2012: Obama, La dernière campagne (1h10). CAPA
 2016: Election américaine: Showtime! (54min). CAPA

Bibliography
 Journal d'une année à part : 11 septembre 2001-11 septembre 2002, Paris: La Martinière, 2002, p. 301 
 Les Bombes humaines : Enquête au cœur du conflit israélo-palestinien, Paris: La Martinière, 2003, p. 223 
 Une Française à New-York, Paris: Robert Laffont, 2007, p. 201 
 Obama président : Saison 1, Paris: Éditions du Moment, 2010, p. 232 
 Made in France : La présidentielle dans l'œil américain, (photogr. Charles Ommanney) Paris: Albin Michel, 2012, p. 173

References

External Links 
 

1966 births
Living people
20th-century French women writers
20th-century French writers
21st-century French women writers
21st-century French writers
French women journalists